Jeremy Anderson may refer to:
Jerime Anderson (born 1989), American basketball player
Jeremy Anderson (golfer), 2000 PGA Tour Qualifying School graduates
Jeremy Anderson (figure skater), 2005 United States Figure Skating Championships

See also
Jerry Anderson (disambiguation)